is a town located on Tanegashima, in Kumage District, Kagoshima Prefecture, Japan.

As of June 2013, the town has an estimated population of 5,925 and a population density of 53.8 persons per km². The total area is 110.40  km².

The headquarters of the Japan Aerospace Exploration Agency are located at the Tanegashima Space Center in Minamitane.

Geography
Minamitane is located on the southern end of Tanegashima, bordered by the East China Sea to the west and the Pacific Ocean to the east, and the town of Nakatane to the north.

Climate
The climate is classified as humid subtropical (Köppen climate classification Cfa) with very warm summers and mild winters. Precipitation is high throughout the year, but is highest in the months of May, June and September. The area is subject to frequent typhoons.

History
Minamitane Village was established on April 1, 1889. In 1879, a government office (役場) was established in the village of Shimama (島間村), also overseeing the villages of Nishino (西之村) and Sakai (坂井村), while another government office was established in Kukinaga (茎永村), also covering the villages of Hirayama (平山村) and Nakano (中之村). These former villages were then merged to form Minamitane Village. Minamitane was upgraded to town status on October 15, 1956.

Transportation

Highway
Japan National Route 58

Notable people
The Mangjeol family of South Korea trace their ancestry to a man from Shimama Village surnamed Amikiri (網切) who went to Korea during the colonial period and settled there. His son married a Korean woman, and his grandson Amikiri Ichirō (網切一郎) chose to remain in South Korea after its independence and naturalised as a South Korean citizen, and changed his name to the Korean reading of its characters, Mangjeol Ilrang.

References

External links

  
 

Towns in Kagoshima Prefecture
Populated coastal places in Japan